= Sama Essa =

Omani poet and critic

- Born: 1954 (age 71–72); Muscat, Oman
- Occupations: poet, writer, and critic
- Years active: 1974–present

Sama Essa, (Arabic:سماء عيسى) an Omani poet and film critic, was born in 1954. He has published more than twenty poetry collections, the last of which was the collection titled "Wake Up, O Garden (in Arabic: Istaiqdi Ayatoha Al-Hadiqa) which was published in 2018.

== Personal life ==
Essa bin Hamad bin Essa Al Tai, known as Sama Essa, was born in Muscat in 1954. He moved with his family to several countries, including Bahrain, Kuwait and the United Arab Emirates. He studied his primary education in Oman, then moved to Bahrain before he completes his secondary studies in Kuwait. Later, he moved to Cairo to continue his university studies. In 1974, he obtained a bachelor's degree in Business Management from Cairo University. After graduation, he worked as a teacher at the Ministry of Education for twenty years.

== Career ==
Essa is one of the most prominent Omani poets and is considered the founder of the modern poem in Oman. His career in poetry began in the seventies and is still continuing until now. He published his first poem in the Yamani magazine "Al-Thaqafa Al-Jadeeda" in 1974, entitled "For Women Who Waited Long". Essa writers poetry, narrative texts, critical essays, plays and scripts. He has published more than twenty collections of poetry, the last of which was the collection of "Wake Up, O Garden" in 2018.

== Works ==
Some of his works includes the following:

- "For Women Who Waited Long" (original title: lilnisa allawati intatharna tawelan), 1974
- "Galaxy" (original title: darb al-tabana), 2001
- "Clouds" (original title: Guyuum), 2006
- "Door Which Were Closed by the Wind" (original title: abwab aghlaqatha alriyah), 2008
- "The Lover's Blood" (original title: dam al-Ashik), 2011
- "A love song to Laila Fakhro" (original title:Oghniyat Hob lylia fakhro), 2012
- "The Distant Mountain" (original title: Al Jabal Al Baeed), 2012
